Yearly Meeting is a term used by members of the Religious Society of Friends, or Quakers, to refer to an organization composed of constituent meetings or churches within a geographical area. The constituent meetings are called Monthly Meetings in most of the world; in England, local congregations are now called Area Meetings, in Australia Monthly Meetings are called Regional Meetings. "Monthly" and "Yearly" refer to how often the body meets to make decisions. Monthly Meetings may be local congregations that hold regular Meetings for Worship, or may comprise a number of Worship Groups (and equivalent congregations with other designations). Depending on the Yearly Meeting organization, there may also be Quarterly Meetings, Half-Yearly Meetings, or Regional Meetings, where a number of local Monthly Meetings come together within a Yearly Meeting.

There are also parallel Yearly Meetings for young Quakers, Junior Yearly Meetings.

General description 
Yearly Meeting gatherings are times for Friends from a wide geographical area to come together to worship and to seek God's guidance on decisions and on issues facing Friends in that region.  Yearly Meetings publish guiding principles, organizational processes, and collected expressions of faith of the constituent Friends.  These publications are called Faith and Practice, and/or Books of Discipline.

Origin 
Like many aspects of Quakerism, the organization into Yearly Meetings arose gradually.  English Friends began to meet shortly after their beginning in a large group starting in the 1650s.  The oldest Yearly Meeting in Britain, Britain Yearly Meeting (originally London Yearly Meeting), considers the year 1668 its official founding. New England Yearly Meeting dates its founding from 1661. In the early days the business of the meeting was to receive answers to the Yearly Meeting's queries to the Quarterly Meetings, to read epistles from traveling Friends, and to seek God's guidance on actions.  They also proposed and planned the establishment of Quaker institutions, such as schools.

As the Religious Society of Friends grew and spread around the world, new Yearly Meetings were established.  While often influenced by the activities of other Yearly Meetings, each of the Yearly Meetings is autonomous.

Procedure 

A session of a Yearly Meeting, as with all Quaker business sessions, is considered a time of worship in dealing with matters of business.  When a matter has been presented and explained, the Friends who are gathered wait in silence, listening to the leading of God's spirit within them.  Those who feel led to do so share their insights, while the others listen.  Eventually a "sense of the meeting" begins to emerge.  The clerk of the meeting (a type of facilitator) or the Recording Clerk (a person who writes the minutes) tries to formulate a minute that reflects the sense of the meeting. More input may follow.  When it is clear that there is agreement, the sense of the meeting is recorded in the minute.  Some Friends at the meeting may have reservations about the matter but choose to defer to the others.  Friends believe and hope that the minute is God's will on the matter. However, nothing is considered a permanent and inviolable law among Friends and every matter is open to future change.

Before the close of a yearly meeting, Friends write an epistle to communicate to other Friends world-wide. It is the custom to read out selections from epistles the Yearly Meeting has received from other Quaker bodies during yearly meeting sessions.

All Friends who are members of a constituent Meeting are members of the corresponding Yearly Meeting and may attend and participate on an equal basis—there is no hierarchy within the Religious Society of Friends.  Many specific issues of concern to Quakers are dealt with by committees appointed by Yearly Meetings.

Names 
Yearly Meetings are named for where they meet: a nation (e.g., Canadian Yearly Meeting), a region within a nation (e.g., New England Yearly Meeting), a state (e.g. Indiana Yearly Meeting), or a large city that serves as a hub (e.g., Philadelphia Yearly Meeting).  The entire name of a Yearly Meeting usually includes the words "of the Religious Society of Friends" (e.g., New York Yearly Meeting of the Religious Society of Friends) although some do not (e.g., Northern Yearly Meeting).

Larger groups 
Many Yearly Meetings are members of larger groups.  In the United States and a few other countries the three main groups of Friends are Friends General Conference, Friends United Meeting, and Evangelical Friends International.  A broader group that crosses theological, organizational, and national lines and encourages communication and cooperation of the different groups is Friends World Committee for Consultation.

List of yearly meetings

Africa 
See also Quakers in Kenya
Kenya
Bware Yearly Meeting, based in Suna
Central Yearly Meeting, based in Kakamega
Chavakali Yearly Meeting
East Africa Yearly Meeting (Kaimosi), based in Tiriki
East Africa Yearly Meeting (North), based in Kitale
Elgon East Yearly Meeting, based in Kitale
Elgon Religious Society of Friends (West), based in Lugulu Via Webuye
Kakamega Yearly Meeting
Lugari Yearly Meeting, based in Turbo
Malava Yearly Meeting
Nairobi Yearly Meeting
Tuoli Yearly Meeting, based in Kapsabet
Vihiga Yearly Meeting
Vokoli Yearly Meeting, based in Wodanga
Outside of Kenya
Burundi Yearly Meeting
Central and Southern Africa Yearly Meeting
Congo Yearly Meeting
East Africa Yearly Meeting
Tanzania Yearly Meeting
Uganda Yearly Meeting

Americas 
See also Quakers in Latin America
Bolivia
Iglesia Evangélica Amigos Central (Central Evangelical Friends Church)
Iglesia Evangélica Unión Boliviana "Amigos" (Bolivian Union Evangelical Friends Church)
Iglesia Nacional Evangélica Los Amigos de Bolivia (National Evangelical Friends Church of Bolivia)
Iglesia Evangélica Misión Boliviana de Santidad Amigos (Bolivian Evangelical Mission Church of Holiness Friends)
Canada
 Canadian Yearly Meeting
Cuba
Cuba Yearly Meeting
Guatemala
Iglesia Evangélica Embajadores Amigos (Evangelical Ambassadors Friends Church)
Iglesia Evangélica Nacional Amigos de Guatemala (National Evangelical Friends Church of Guatemala)
Junta  Amigos de Santidad (Friends of Holiness Yearly Meeting)
El Salvador
Iglesias Evangélicas de los Amigos en El Salvador (Evangelical Friends Churches in El Salvador)
Honduras
 Junta Annual Amigos de Santidad (Friends of Holiness Yearly Meeting)
Jamaica
Jamaica Yearly Meeting
Mexico
Asociación Religiosa de las Iglesias Evangélicas de los Amigos (Religious Association of the Evangelical Churches of Friends)
Reunion General de los Amigos en México (General Meeting of Friends in Mexico)
Peru
 Iglesia Nacional Evangélica Los Amigos del Perú (National Evangelical Friends Church of Peru)
United States
Conservative
Iowa Yearly Meeting (Conservative)—Meetings for Worship in Iowa, Minnesota, Missouri, Nebraska, South Dakota, and Wisconsin.
North Carolina Yearly Meeting—Meetings for Worship in North Carolina, Virginia Beach, VA, and Florida.
Ohio Yearly Meeting—Meetings for Worship in Ohio, Georgia, Michigan, Pennsylvania, Virginia, and West Virginia.  This Meeting offers "affiliate membership" for individual Friends or small congregations worldwide isolated from other Conservative Meetings.  Affiliates are as far away as Midlands in England and Athens, Greece.
Evangelical Friends International
Alaska Yearly Meeting—Meetings for Worship in Alaska.
Evangelical Friends Church—Eastern Region—Meetings for Worship in Florida, Michigan, North Carolina, Ohio, Pennsylvania, Rhode Island, and Virginia.
Evangelical Friends Church—Mid-America—Meetings for Worship in Colorado, Kansas, Missouri, Oklahoma, and Texas.
Evangelical Friends Church—Southwest—Arizona, California, and Nevada.
Northwest Yearly Meeting—Meetings for Worship in Idaho, Oregon, and Washington State.
Rocky Mountain Yearly Meeting—Meetings for Worship in Arizona, Colorado, and Nebraska.
Friends General Conference
Alaska Friends Conference
Baltimore Yearly Meeting—Meetings for Worship in the District of Columbia, Maryland, Pennsylvania, Virginia, and West Virginia. (Participates in both Friends General Conference and Friends United Meeting)
Illinois Yearly Meeting—Meetings for Worship in Missouri, Illinois, and Indiana.
Intermountain Yearly Meeting—Meetings for Worship in Arizona, Colorado, New Mexico, South Dakota, Texas, and Utah.
Lake Erie Yearly Meeting—Meetings for Worship in Michigan, Ohio, and Pennsylvania.
New England Yearly Meeting—Meetings for Worship in Connecticut, Maine, Massachusetts, New Hampshire, Rhode Island, and Vermont. (Participates in both Friends General Conference and Friends United Meeting)
New York Yearly Meeting—Meetings for Worship in Connecticut, New Jersey, and New York. (Participates in both Friends General Conference and Friends United Meeting)
Northern Yearly Meeting—Meetings for Worship in Iowa, Michigan, Minnesota, North Dakota, and Wisconsin. (Participates in both Friends General Conference and Friends United Meeting)
Ohio Valley Yearly Meeting—Meetings for Worship in Indiana, Kentucky, and Ohio.
Philadelphia Yearly Meeting—Meetings for Worship in Delaware, Maryland, New Jersey, and Pennsylvania.
Piedmont Friends Fellowship (PFF is a fellowship of monthly meetings and a yearly meeting)—Meetings for Worship in North Carolina, Virginia and Lyman, South Carolina.
South Central Yearly Meeting—Meetings for Worship in Arkansas, Louisiana, Missouri, Oklahoma, and Texas.
Southeastern Yearly Meeting—Meetings for Worship in Florida, Georgia, and South Carolina. (Participates in both Friends General Conference and Friends United Meeting)
Southern Appalachian Yearly Meeting Association—Meetings for Worship in Alabama, Georgia, Kentucky, Mississippi, North Carolina, South Carolina, Tennessee and West Virginia.
Friends United Meeting
Baltimore Yearly Meeting—Meetings for Worship in the District of Columbia, Maryland, Pennsylvania, and Virginia. (Participates in both Friends General Conference and Friends United Meeting)
Great Plains Yearly Meeting—Meetings for Worship in Kansas, Nebraska, and Oklahoma.
Indiana Yearly Meeting—Meetings for Worship in Indiana, Michigan, and Ohio.
Iowa Yearly Meeting (FUM)—Meetings for Worship in Iowa, Minnesota, and Wisconsin.
New Association of Friends—Meetings for Worship in Indiana, Michigan, and Ohio.
New England Yearly Meeting—Meetings for Worship in Connecticut, Maine, Massachusetts, New Hampshire, Rhode Island, and Vermont. (Participates in both Friends General Conference and Friends United Meeting)
New York Yearly Meeting—Meetings for Worship in Connecticut, New Jersey, and New York. (Participates in both Friends General Conference and Friends United Meeting)
North Carolina Yearly Meeting (FUM)—Meetings for Worship in North Carolina and Virginia.
Northern Yearly Meeting—Meetings for Worship in Iowa, Michigan, Minnesota, North Dakota, and Wisconsin. (Participates in both Friends General Conference and Friends United Meeting)
Southeastern Yearly Meeting—Meetings for Worship in Florida, Georgia, and South Carolina. (Participates in both Friends General Conference and Friends United Meeting)
Western Association of the Religious Society of Friends (WARSF)—Meeting for Worship in Whittier, CA.
Western Yearly Meeting—Meetings for Worship in Illinois and Indiana.
Wilmington Yearly Meeting—Meetings for Worship in Ohio and Tennessee.
Independent
Central Yearly Meeting—Meetings for Worship in Arkansas, Indiana, North Carolina, and Ohio.  According to Quaker historian Ben Pink Dandelion, "Central Yearly Meeting has little or no contact with the rest of the Quaker world.  It broke away from Five Years Meeting in 1926 and represents a Holiness Yearly Meeting."
Missouri Valley Friends Conference
North Pacific Yearly Meeting—Meetings for Worship in Idaho, Montana, Oregon, Washington, and Wyoming. (A Beanite yearly meeting with informal ties to Friends General Conference, some Monthly Meetings are affiliated with FGC).
 Pacific Yearly Meeting—Meetings for Worship in California, Hawaii, Mexico, and Guatemala. (A Beanite yearly meeting with informal ties to Friends General Conference, some Monthly Meetings are affiliated with FGC).
Sierra-Cascades Yearly Meeting of Friends—Meetings for Worship in Washington, Oregon, California, and Idaho. It broke from Northwest Yearly Meeting in 2017.

Asia 
India
General Conference of Friends in India
Bundelkhand Yearly Meeting (Bundelkhand Masihi Mitr Samaj)
Mid-India Yearly Meeting
Bhopal Yearly Meeting
Outside of India
Cambodia Yearly Meeting
Indonesia Yearly Meeting
Japan Yearly Meeting
Middle East Yearly Meeting
(Nepal) Evangelical Friends Church
Philippine Evangelical Friends Church
Taiwan Yearly Meeting

Australia and Oceania 
Australia Yearly Meeting
Aotearoa/New Zealand Yearly Meeting (Te Hāhi Tūhauwiri)

Europe 
See also Quakers in Europe
Britain Yearly Meeting
Denmark Yearly Meeting
(Hungary) Evangelical Friends Church
Finland Yearly Meeting
France Yearly Meeting
Germany Yearly Meeting (or )—Quaker communities were established in 1677 and 1678 in what is now Germany at Emden and Friedrichstadt (extinct in 1727).  English and American Friends organized a Quaker colony in Friedensthal (Peace Valley), which existed from 1792 until 1870 in what is now Bad Pyrmont, a city in the district of Hamelin-Pyrmont, in Lower Saxony (Niedersachsen), Germany.  Land was donated for a meeting house in January 1791 and the Quaker House was built.  In 1933, it was reconstructed and relocated from its original site to Bombergallee 9, Bad Pyrmont.  The German Annual Meeting was organized in 1880.  Relief work following World War I revitalized German Quakerism. The German Yearly Meeting ( or ) resulted from the 1923 mergers of the German Annual Meeting with the Friends of Quakerism and, in 1925, the Federation of German Friends and serves as an umbrella organization for the small liberal Quaker presence in Germany and Austria.  This body uses a translation of Britain Yearly Meeting's current book of discipline  Quaker Faith and Practice: The book of Christian discipline of the Yearly Meeting of the Religious Society of Friends (Quakers) in Britain entitled 
Ireland Yearly Meeting
Netherlands Yearly Meeting
Norway Yearly Meeting
Sweden Yearly Meeting
Switzerland Yearly Meeting

References

Sources

External links
Friends (Quaker) Yearly Meetings and Broader Bodies on the Internet
Yearly Meetings' Histories, Previous Names, Mergers, etc.

Quaker organizations